Bannister River is a river in the South West region of Western Australia.

The river rises to the east of North Bannister and flows in a southerly direction  discharging into the Hotham River near Boddington.

The river was named after Captain Thomas Bannister who was the first European to visit the river in 1830 by Surveyor General John Septimus Roe in 1832.

References 

Rivers of the South West region